Year of the Beast is a studio album by American rapper C-Rayz Walz. It was released on Definitive Jux in 2005. The CD version of the album was initially released in a limited edition with a bonus DVD.

Critical reception
Tom Breihan of Pitchfork gave the album a 4.2 out of 10, saying: "There's no sweep or vision, and so Walz's worst flaws are left exposed: his tendency to lose the beat, his obnoxious habit of multi-tracking his own voice, the lack of force or immediacy in his jumpy, splenetic delivery." Mike Schiller of PopMatters gave the album 5 stars out of 10, saying: "Even if you think what you're hearing is pretty decent, there's very little chance you remember much of it once you flip it off."

Track listing

References

External links 
 

2005 albums
C-Rayz Walz albums
Definitive Jux albums
Albums produced by Aesop Rock
Albums produced by Emile Haynie
Albums produced by El-P